Krusin  is a village in the administrative district of Gmina Koziegłowy, within Myszków County, Silesian Voivodeship, in southern Poland.

The village has a population of 240.

References

Krusin